The Palace plot of Renyin year, also known as the Palace Women's Uprising, was a Ming dynasty plot against the Jiajing Emperor, where 16 palace women attempted to murder the emperor. It occurred in 1542, the 21st year of the reign of the Jiajing Emperor and the renyin year of the sexagenary cycle, hence its name.

Causes
The Jiajing Emperor has been called the “Daoist emperor”, due to his adherence to Daoist beliefs, particularly that of divination and alchemy. One of the alchemical concoctions he took to prolong his life was red lead, a substance made from the menstrual blood of female virgins. Girls aged 13–14 were kept for this purpose, and were fed only mulberry leaves and rainwater. Any girls who developed illnesses were thrown out and they could be beaten for the slightest offence. It has been suggested that this cruel treatment led to the uprising.

Another version of the story is that the Jiajing Emperor's garden had many banana trees, and the morning dew collected from the leaves tasted sweet and refreshing. The Jiajing Emperor thus drank the water, believing it would promote longevity. Young girls in the palace were made to collect the dew every morning, and many of them fell ill due to the cold.

Sometimes older women were sent to collect the dew as a form of punishment. One time, the emperor was given a 'longevity turtle' dyed in 5 different colours, and he ordered his lower-ranking concubines to care for the animal. However, the turtle died, and the furious Emperor ordered the concubines to collect the morning dew. Around the same time, Imperial Concubine Wang Ning was spreading rumours that the emperor had lost the favour of Heaven because he had been enchanted by his favourite concubine, Consort Duan. The rumour alleged that Consort Duan was actually a fox spirit and her spell on the emperor offended Heaven. When the emperor found out, he ordered Imperial Concubine Wang Ning to collect the dew as punishment. When in the garden, the Imperial Concubine met other concubines who had been similarly punished, and they hatched a plan. If the emperor were found dead in Consort Duan's quarters, the incident of the dead turtle would be forgotten, and the Imperial Concubine would be vindicated for saying that the emperor had lost Heaven's favour due to Consort Duan.

Events
In 1542, the emperor was staying in Consort Duan's quarters. A group of palace women pretended to wait on him, tied a rope around his neck and attempted to strangle him. They failed to do so and, in the meantime, one of them got cold feet and went to alert Empress Fang. The empress hurried over, and the palace eunuchs revived the emperor. The palace women were all arrested.

Participants
The role of each individual in the attempt on the emperor's life was judged and recorded as below:
Concubine Ning, of the Wang clan (宁嫔王氏), head of the plot
Consort Duan, the assault happened in her quarters
Chen Juhua (陈菊花), personally involved in strangling the emperor
Deng Jinxiang (邓金香), conspired to murder the emperor
Guan Meixiu (关梅秀), personally involved in strangling the emperor
Huang Yulian (黄玉莲), conspired to murder the emperor
Liu Miaolian (刘妙莲), personally involved in strangling the emperor
Su Zhouyao (苏川药), personally involved in strangling the emperor
Wang Xiulan (王秀兰), personally involved in strangling the emperor
Xing Cuilian (邢翠莲), personally involved in strangling the emperor
Xu Qiuhua (徐秋花), conspired to murder the emperor
Yang Cuiying (杨翠英), personally involved in strangling the emperor
Yang Jinying (杨金英), personally involved in strangling the emperor
Yang Yuxiang (杨玉香), personally involved in strangling the emperor
Yao Shucui (姚淑翠), personally involved in strangling the emperor
Zhang Chunjing (张春景), conspired to murder the emperor
Zhang Jinlian (张金莲), reported the murder attempt to Empress Fang

Aftermath
After the attack, the Jiajing Emperor was unconscious for several days, so Empress Fang set the punishment for the palace women. She ordered all of them, including Zhang Jinlian, who had informed her of the attack, to death by slow slicing. Although Consort Duan had not been present, the empress decided that she had been involved with the plot and sentenced her to death too. The bodies of the palace women, Imperial Concubine Ning, and Consort Duan were then displayed. 10 members of the women's families were also beheaded, while a further 20 were enslaved and gifted to ministers.

Consequences
Although the Jiajing Emperor had been incapacitated at the time, he resented Empress Fang for having killed his favourite concubine, Consort Duan. He later determined Consort Duan had been innocent and suspected the Empress of using the situation to rid herself of a hated rival. In 1547, when a fire destroyed parts of the palace, the emperor refused to have Empress Fang rescued, and she burned to death. The emperor claimed that this was the will of heaven.

After the uprising, the Jiajing Emperor did not stop creating red lead. Instead, he ordered restrictions on girls entering the palace to be tightened. In 1547, 300 girls between the ages of 11 and 14 were selected as new palace women. In 1552, a further 200 girls were selected to serve in the palace, but the lower age limit was reduced to eight years old. Three years later, in 1555, 150 girls below the age of eight were taken into the palace to be used for making the emperor’s medicine.

References

Notes

Works cited

Conflicts in 1542
1542 in Asia
Failed assassination attempts in Asia
Ming dynasty
Conspiracies
16th-century coups d'état and coup attempts